Irene Bertschek is a German economist and head of the Research Department Digital Economy at the ZEW – Leibniz Centre for European Economic Research in Mannheim. She holds a professorship of economics of digitalisation at University of Giessen and is a member of the Commission of Experts for Research and Innovation (EFI), advising the Federal German government.

Biography and career
Bertschek studied economics with a focus on industrial economics and econometrics at University of Mannheim (Diploma, 1992) and at Université catholique de Louvain in Louvain-la-Neuve, Belgium (M.A., 1991). Within the European Doctoral Program in Quantitative Economics, she held positions at the Centre de Recherche en Économie et Statistique (CREST-INSEE) in Paris, at the Humboldt University Berlin and at the Institut de Statistique Université catholique de Louvain. In 1996, she completed her doctoral thesis on „Semiparametric Analysis of Innovative Behaviour“ at Université catholique de Louvain in Louvain-la-Neuve, Belgium.

Research
In her research, Bertschek investigates industrial economic aspects of digitalization with a special focus on the impact of digitalisation on firms’ innovation, productivity and work organization. Her methodological expertise lies in the field of microeconometrics and the analysis of firm-level data.

Publications (selection)
 Irene Bertschek, Michael Polder and Patrick Schulte (2019), ICT and Resilience in Times of Crisis: Evidence from Cross-Country Micro Moments Data, Economics of Innovation and New Technology 28(8), S. 759–74.
 Irene Bertschek, Daniel Cerquera and Gordon J Klein (2013), More Bits - More Bucks? Measuring the Impact of Broadband Internet on Firm Performance, Information Economics and Policy 25(3), S. 190–203.
 Irene Bertschek and Ulrich Kaiser (2004), Productivity Effects of Organizational Change: Microeconometric Evidence, Management Science 50(3), S. 394–404.
 Irene Bertschek and Michael Lechner (1998), Convenient Estimators for the Panel Probit Model, Journal of Econometrics 87(2), S. 329–71.
 Irene Bertschek (1995), Product and Process Innovation as a Response to Increasing Imports and Foreign Direct Investment, The Journal of Industrial Economics, S. 341–57.

References

External links
 Research Department Digital Economy at ZEW Mannheim 
 Professor of Economics of Digitalisation at Justus-Liebig-University Gießen
 Commission of Experts for Research and Innovation

German women academics
German women economists
Living people
21st-century German economists
Year of birth missing (living people)